Idrottsföreningen Brommapojkarna, more commonly known as Brommapojkarna (meaning the Bromma boys) or simply BP, is a Swedish football club located in the borough of Bromma, in the western parts of Stockholm municipality. Brommapojkarna is the largest football club in Europe in terms of the number of active teams of all ages – in 2007 there were 247 teams and 3,000 players. The women's team plays in Damallsvenskan, the first tier and the men's team plays in the Allsvenskan, the first tier.

The club is famous for its youth academy, which has produced numerous top-quality Swedish players throughout the years. The club is affiliated to the Stockholms Fotbollförbund.

History

The club was formed in 1942. It has earlier had many more sports on its programme, such as athletics, bandy and ice hockey.

They became affiliated with Manchester United after Bojan Djordjic was transferred to the Red Devils in 1999. However, this deal has since expired as BP believed it would weaken talks with other Premiership clubs. The club now has a similar affiliation with local United rivals Manchester City, where former BP youth, and Sweden International John Guidetti marked his trade, until his transfer to La Liga club Celta Vigo in 2015.

The club was promoted to the Allsvenskan for the first time on 12 November 2006 after beating BK Häcken in the promotion-relegation play-offs. On 16 November 2008, the team reached Allsvenskan for the second time after a 1–1 draw against Ljungskile SK. It guaranteed remain in Allsvenskan for 2010 season despite losing 3–0 to home match against IFK Göteborg on October 23, 2009. In 2010, BP came in last and were relegated to Superettan, where they played in 2011 and 2012. In 2012 they finished 2nd in Superettan and were promoted to Allsvenskan for the third time.

Players

First-team squad

Notable players
List criteria:
 player has been inducted into the official "Hall of Fame" of IF Brommapojkarna.

European record

Notes
 1Q: First qualifying round
 2Q: Second qualifying round
 3Q: Third qualifying round

Season to season

Attendances

In recent seasons IF Brommapojkarna have had the following average attendances:

Honours
 Superettan:
 Winners (2): 2017, 2022 
 Runners-up (1): 2012
 Division 1 Norra:
 Winners (1): 2016
 Division 2 Östra Svealand:
 Winners (3): 1998, 2000, 2001

Managers
 Gösta Sandberg (1959–61)
 Henry Carlsson (1969–71)
 Gösta Sandberg (1972–78)
 Tommy Söderberg (1982–85)
 Thomas Lyth (1986–89)
 Erik Hamrén (1990–91)
 Dan Sundblad (1991–93)
 Bo Petersson (1994)
 Kjell Jonevret (1995)
 Thomas Lyth (1995–97)
 Jari Pyykölä (1998–99)
 Dan Sundblad (1999)
 Benny Persson (2000–03)
 Anders Grönhagen (Jan 1, 2004 – Dec 31, 2004)
 Claes Eriksson (Jan 1, 2005 – Dec 31, 2007)
 Kim Bergstrand (2008–10)
 Roberth Björknesjö (Oct 1, 2010 – Nov 30, 2013)
 Stefan Billborn (2013–14)
 Magni Fannberg Magnússon (2014–15)
 Olof Mellberg (Nov 27, 2015 – Nov 21, 2017)
 Luís  Pimenta (Dec 13, 2017–September 5, 2018)
 Roberth Björknesjö (Sep 10, 2010 – Aug 31, 2019)
 Kjell Jonevret (Sep 1, 2019 – Nov 30, 2019)
 Shaun Constable (Dec 1, 2019 – Dec 31, 2020)
 Christer Mattiasson (Jan 1, 2021 – Dec 31, 2022)
 Olof Mellberg &  Andreas Engelmark (Jan 1, 2023 – Present)

Footnotes

References

External links

 
 

 
Allsvenskan clubs
Football clubs in Stockholm
Association football clubs established in 1942
Bandy clubs established in 1942
1942 establishments in Sweden